Big Jet TV is a British YouTube channel that records and livestreams aeroplanes landing at major airports. It made international headlines in 2022 during Storm Eunice, as the channel livestreamed planes landing at London's Heathrow Airport in very high winds. The BBC carried a report titled "Big Jet TV turns plane-watching into a phenomenon". The channel was founded in 2016 by Jerry Dyer, an aviation enthusiast who livestreams with commentary from the roof of an adapted van using a Panasonic HC-VX1 camcorder.

References

External links

Official YouTube Channel

YouTube channels
British YouTubers
English-language YouTube channels
Online edutainment
Educational and science YouTubers
2016 establishments in the United Kingdom